Phrynobatrachus mababiensis or the Mababe puddle frog is a species of frog in the family Phrynobatrachidae.
It is found in Angola, Botswana, Democratic Republic of the Congo, Eswatini, Kenya, Malawi, Mozambique, Namibia, South Africa, Tanzania, Zambia, Zimbabwe, possibly Ethiopia, possibly Sudan, and possibly Uganda.

Habitat
It is found most commonly in subtropical or tropical dry shrubland, subtropical or tropical moist shrubland, subtropical or tropical dry lowland grassland, subtropical or tropical seasonally wet or flooded lowland grassland, rivers, swampland, freshwater lakes, intermittent freshwater lakes, freshwater marshes, intermittent freshwater marshes.

It is able to survive in agricultural lands, rural gardens, water storage areas, ponds, seasonally flooded agricultural land, and canals and ditches.

Conservation status
The Mababe puddle frog is a common and widespread species an adaptable species.
There are no reports of it being harvested and is not facing any significant threats.

References

 

mababiensis
Frogs of Africa
Amphibians of Angola
Amphibians of Botswana
Amphibians of the Democratic Republic of the Congo
Amphibians of Eswatini
Amphibians of Kenya
Amphibians of Malawi
Amphibians of Mozambique
Amphibians of Namibia
Amphibians of South Africa
Amphibians of Tanzania
Amphibians of Zambia
Amphibians of Zimbabwe
Amphibians described in 1932
Taxa named by Vivian Frederick Maynard FitzSimons
Taxonomy articles created by Polbot